Hakan Özmert (born 3 June 1985) is a professional footballer who plays as a midfielder for Süper Lig club Antalyaspor. Born in France, he represents Turkey internationally.

Club career
Özmert began his professional career with Sakaryaspor, and appeared in 26 Süper Lig matches for the club. In 2005, he was loaned out to Karşıyaka and later made a permanent move to Antalyaspor in July 2007. On 4 July 2015, Özmert signed for Sivasspor.

International career
Despite being born in France, Özmert has exclusively represented Turkey in youth competitions. He has played for the Turkish U16s, U18s, and U19s.

References

External links
 

1985 births
Living people
French footballers
Turkish footballers
Turkey youth international footballers
Association football midfielders
FC Nantes players
Sakaryaspor footballers
Karşıyaka S.K. footballers
Antalyaspor footballers
Kardemir Karabükspor footballers
Orduspor footballers
Kasımpaşa S.K. footballers
Sivasspor footballers
İstanbul Başakşehir F.K. players
Süper Lig players
French people of Turkish descent